Hyatt Terraces Baguio, also known as the Terraces Plaza, was a 12-storey hotel located along South Drive in Baguio, Philippines. It was destroyed during the 1990 Luzon earthquake.

History
Before the Hyatt management's takeover in 1979, the Terraces Plaza was built during the Philippines "hotel boom," opening in time for the World Bank-International Monetary Fund 1976 meeting of the Board of Governors which was held in Manila.

General Manager Heinrich Maulbecker of Hyatt Bangkok was tasked in 1978 to check on a property in Baguio called The Terraces Plaza to study the viability of converting the hotel property into a Hyatt brand. The Terraces Plaza was later rebranded as Hyatt Terraces Plaza Baguio and Maulbecker became the general manager of the Baguio hotel until the destruction of the hotel during the 1990 Luzon earthquake.

It sustained the most serious damage among buildings in Baguio, with the hotel's terraced front wing collapsing and falling into the lobby area which caused the deaths of at least 50 people.

Facilities
The hotel had three restaurants including a coffee shop: The Kaili Cafe, The Copper Gill, and the Hanazono Japanese Buffet. The hotel also had three bars: The Fireplace Bar, Gold Mine Disco Bar and The Kaili Bar located near the casino. The hotel also had a swimming pool, jacuzzi, and a spa. The hotel also had a casino located at the other side of the atrium lobby.

References

Hyatt Hotels and Resorts
Demolished buildings and structures in the Philippines
Former buildings and structures in the Philippines
Buildings and structures in Baguio
Hotels in the Philippines
Demolished hotels
Hotel buildings completed in 1976
Defunct hotels